Silver Lake is a small lake primarily located in St. Anthony, Minnesota with a small portion in Columbia Heights, Minnesota.

Geography 

There are two islands on this lake. One is part of Silverwood Park, and the other is uninhabited.

Silver Lake is surrounded by St. Anthony to the north, east, and south, and by Columbia Heights to the west. 

The northern shore of Silver Lake is home to Silverwood Park and Silver Beach. The west and south shores are surrounded by upper-class houses. Not too far from the houses on the south shore is Silver Lake Village, a major commercial hub. The east shore is parallel to Silver Lake Road.

Recreation 
There are two parks along this lake. Silverwood Park is nestled on the north shore of the lake and is the larger and more popular of the two. West of Silverwood is Silver Beach, which is owned and operated by the Columbia Heights Recreation Department. Unlike Silverwood, it features a playground and a beach. A trail connects the two parks together.

References

Lakes of Anoka County, Minnesota
Lakes of Ramsey County, Minnesota